Tharcisse Kasongo Mwema Yamba-Yamba (October 1952 – 12 November 2022) was a Congolese journalist and politician.

Biography
Kasongo grew up in Lubumbashi and began his journalistic career in 1972 in the sports field. He then left the sports department and became a press secretary for the government of Zaire.

In 1992, he left Zaire for France after losing a petition signed to demand freedom of information from President Mobutu Sese Seko. He joined the Radio France Internationale team, reporting on African affairs.

Kasongo returned to the DRC in 2008 to teach at the University of Lubumbashi and joined Kyondo Radio Télévision.

Kasongo died in Kinshasa on 12 November 2022, at the age of 70.

Works
Enjeux et Publics de la télévision en République Démocratique du Congo (1990-2005) (2007)

References

1952 births
2022 deaths
Democratic Republic of the Congo journalists
Democratic Republic of the Congo politicians
People from Katanga Province
Academic staff of the University of Lubumbashi